Sinmokdong is a railway station on Line 9 of the Seoul Subway.

Name
The station was originally proposed to be named Yongwangsan station after Yongwang mountain, but was  changed to its current name due to the request of residents.

Exit names
Exit 1 is named after Yongwang mountain park, Exit 2 is connected to  Mokwon elementary school, Mokdong 119 safety center, and the Ewha Womans University Mokdong Hospital.Exit 3 connects to bicycle parking spaces and the Anyangcheon stream.

Station layout

References

Seoul Metropolitan Subway stations
Metro stations in Yangcheon District
Railway stations opened in 2009